Milford Phillips Norton (January 23, 1794 – June 8, 1860) was a justice of the Supreme Court of the Republic of Texas from 1845 to 1846.

References

Justices of the Republic of Texas Supreme Court
1794 births
1860 deaths
19th-century American judges